David Johns is an American painter.

David Johns may also refer to:

 David Johns (cricketer) (1921–1979), English cricketer
Dave Johns (born 1956), comedian
David Mervyn Johns (1899–1992), Welsh film and television character actor
David Johns (antiquary) of Ynysymaengwyn

See also
David John (disambiguation)

David Jones (disambiguation)